The Wicherina worm-lizard (Aprasia wicherina) is a species of lizard in the Pygopodidae family endemic to Australia.

References

Pygopodids of Australia
Aprasia
Reptiles described in 2015